Wu Kong  is a 2017 Chinese fantasy-action-adventure film directed by Derek Kwok and produced by Huang Jianxin, starring Eddie Peng in the title role alongside Ni Ni, Shawn Yue, Oho Ou and Zheng Shuang. It is based on a popular internet novel titled Wukong Biography written by Jin Hezai. The film was released in China on 13 July 2017.

It is available on Amazon Prime and on Tubi TV under the title Immortal Demon Slayer.

Plot
Set 500 years before the Monkey King wreaks havoc in the heavenly kingdom, it tells the stories of Wukong, who is unwilling to bow down to his own destiny, sets out to rebel against the gods.

Cast
Eddie Peng as Sun Wukong 
Ni Ni as Ah Zi 
Shawn Yue as Yang Jian (Erlang Shen)
Oho Ou as Tian Peng
Zheng Shuang as Ah Yue
Qiao Shan as Juan Lian 
Faye Yu as Hua Ji
Yang Di as Ju Ling
Quentin Zhang as White Robe Immortal 
Linda Zhao as Girl

Soundtrack
Purples (紫) performed by Tanya Chua composed by Yusuke Hatano
Sky (空) performed by Terry Lin composed by Wan Pin Chu
The Monkey King (齐天) by Hua Chenyu

Release
The film was released in China on 13 July 2017 in MX4D, 4DX, IMAX 3D, 3D and China Film Giant Screen.

Reception
The film has grossed  in China.

Awards and nominations

References

External links
 
Wu Kong on Douban
 Wu Kong at New Classics Media

2010s fantasy adventure films
2017 films
Chinese fantasy adventure films
Films based on Journey to the West
Films based on Chinese novels
Films directed by Derek Kwok
4DX films
Chinese 3D films
2017 3D films
IMAX films